Ramal de Vila Viçosa is a closed railway line which connected the stations of Estremoz and Vila Viçosa, in Portugal. It was opened in 1905, and closed in 1990.

See also 
 List of railway lines in Portugal
 List of Portuguese locomotives and railcars
 History of rail transport in Portugal

References

Sources

Railway lines in Portugal
Railway lines opened in 1905
Railway lines closed in 1990
Iberian gauge railways
1905 establishments in Portugal